Jean-Christophe Bouvet (born 24 March 1947) is a French actor, film director and writer.

Filmography

As actor

1969: La philosophie dans le boudoir as Le grand prêtre
1975: Change pas de main as Alain
1977: La Machine (directed by Paul Vecchiali) as Pierre Lentier
1977: Le théâtre des matières (directed by Jean-Claude Biette) as Christophe
1980: C'est la vie! as Richard
1980: Le borgne
1981: Loin de Manhattan as Christian
1983: Archipel des amours as Le travelo (segment "Masculins singuliers")
1983: At the Top of the Stairs as Un snob à l'exposition
1987: Sous le soleil de Satan (directed by Maurice Pialat) as Le maquignon
1991: J'embrasse pas (directed by André Téchiné) as Le client au bois
1992: Savage Nights (Les Nuits fauves) (directed by Cyril Collard) as Serge
1992: Krapatchouk as Ministre
1994: La Cité de la peur directed by Alain Berbérian) as Jean-Paul Martoni, le député du R.E.P.N.
1994: L'Eau froide directed by Olivier Assayas) as Professeur
1994: Le terminus de Rita
1995: Le rocher d'Acapulco as Le maître de cérémonie
1995: Le complexe de Toulon (directed by Jean-Claude Biette) as Chris Patsch
1996: Le contre-ciel
1997: Vicious Circles (directed by Sandy Whitelaw) as Le Notaire
1998: Le plaisir (et ses petits tracas) as Bob, le dealer
1998: L'examen de minuit as Le Vendeur du Manoir
1999: Gloria (directed by Manuela Viegas) as Vicente
1999: Les passagers (directed by Jean-Claude Guiguet) as Le Voyageur
1999: Recto/Verso as Maître Maillard
1999: Lovers as Le Kiosquier
1999: Le domaine
2000: Taxi 2 (directed by Gérard Krawczyk) as Général Edmond Bertineau
2000: Lise et André (directed by Denis Dercourt) as Charles
2000: La chambre obscure
2001: Folle de Rachid en transit sur Mars (segment "Eléphants de la planète Mars, Les")
2001: La boîte (directed by Claude Zidi) as Bloret
2001: Off to the Revolution by a 2CV as Capo inpresa polizia
2001: Being Light as Hotel clerk
2002: Jojo la frite (directed by Nicolas Cuche) as Benz
2002: Les naufragés de la D17 (directed by Luc Moullet) as Le sergent chef
2002: Le nouveau Jean-Claude as Le directeur du grand magasin
2002: The Red Siren (directed by Olivier Megaton) as Lucas
2003: Taxi 3 (directed by Gérard Krawczyk) as Général Edmond Bertineau
2003: Saltimbank (directed by Jean-Claude Biette) as Bruno Saltim
2004: À vot' bon coeur as Le vice-président de la Commission de l'Avance sur Recettes
2004: Notre musique (directed by Jean-Luc Godard) as C. Maillard
2004: Courts mais GAY: Tome 8 as Le père (segment "Prisonnier")
2004: Mensonges et trahisons et plus si affinités... (directed by Laurent Tirard) as L'éditeur
2005: Comme un frère as L'admirateur
2005: Journal IV
2006: L'Ivresse du pouvoir (directed by Claude Chabrol) as Me Parlebas
2006: Les Brigades du Tigre (directed by Jérôme Cornuau) as Le juge au procès
2006: Marie-Antoinette (directed by Sofia Coppola) as Duc de Choiseul
2006: Il sera une fois (directed by Sandrine Veysset) as Henri, le père de Pierrot
2006: Chacun sa nuit (directed by Pascal Arnold et Jean-Marc Barr) as Vincent Sylvaire
2006: La vie privée (directed by Mehdi Ben Attia et Zina Modiano) as Jean-Emmanuel
2006: Le prestige de la mort as Maître chanteur
2006: Lisa et le pilote d'avion (directed by Philippe Barassat) as Le pilote
2007: Taxi 4 as Général Edmond Bertineau
2007: La France as Elias
2007: Capitaine Achab as Le roi d'Angletere
2007: L'Auberge rouge as Maître Rouget
2008: Des Indes à la planète Mars as M. Senn
2009: La famille Wolberg as Maurice, le médecin
2009: Cinéman as Monsieur Coq - le proviseur
2009: The Beast (La bête)
2010: L'autre Dumas as M. Bocquin
2010: Black Venus as Charles Mercailler, le journaliste
2010: Belleville-Tokyo as Jean-Loup
2011: Cat Run as Dobber
2011: Let My People Go! as Commissaire
2011: Notre Paradis as Le premier client
2012: Paris by Night as L'hôte au Café Carmen
2012: Désordres as Le proviseur
2012: Les Rencontres d'après minuit as Brigadier chef / Chief Brigadier
2013: Gare du Nord as Juriste
2013: Hasta mañana as Jean-Louis
2015: Deux Rémi, deux as Gauthier
2016: Jours de France as L'homme de Savoie
2016: Where Horses Go To Die (directed by Antony Hickling) as Daniel
2016: Sélection officielle as Jean-Michel Bitume
2017: We Are Tourists as Jacky
2017: Des amours, désamour as Le père de Manon
2018: Que le diable nous emporte as Tonton
2018: La légende as Président Rousseleau
2018: L'oeuf dure as Lui-même
2020: La rupture as Jean
2020: Emily in Paris as Pierre Cadault
 2021: ''Down in Paris by Antony Hickling

External links 

 

1947 births
Living people
French film directors
French male film actors
Male actors from Paris
20th-century French male actors
21st-century French male actors
French male screenwriters
French screenwriters
French male stage actors
French male television actors